Kamyshtau (Qamıştaw) is a rural locality (a village) in Chukadybashevsky Selsoviet, Tuymazinsky District, Bashkortostan, Russia. The population was 29 as of 2010. There are 2 streets.

Geography 
Kamyshtau is located 18 km southeast of Tuymazy (the district's administrative centre) by road.

References 

Rural localities in Tuymazinsky District